Rubin Williams (born April 9, 1976) is an American professional boxer. He challenged for the IBF super middleweight title in 2005.

Professional career
Known as "Mr. Hollywood", Williams began his professional career in 2001, and in 2005 challenged the IBF super middleweight title holder Jeff Lacy, but lost via TKO.  In 2007 he drew with contender Antwun Echols. After this fight he was sporting a record of 29-2-1.

Since then, Williams has been on a long losing skid, as of 2018, owning a 29-33-1 record as a professional boxer.

The Contender
Williams was one of the featured boxers in Season 3 of the boxing reality TV series The Contender, which premiered September 4, 2007 on ESPN.  He was eliminated in the first episode.

Mixed martial arts
Williams was defeated, by submission (kimura), in his MMA debut against Kazushi Sakuraba on Dream 11 on October 6, 2009.

Professional boxing record

Mixed martial arts record

|-
|  Loss
|align=center|0–1
|Kazushi Sakuraba
|Submission (kimura)
|DREAM.11: Feather Weight Grand Prix 2009 Final Round
|
|align=center|1
|align=center|2:53
|Yokohama, Japan
|

References

External links
 

1976 births
Boxers from Detroit
Living people
American male mixed martial artists
Mixed martial artists utilizing boxing
American male boxers
Heavyweight boxers